Julián Coronel (born 23 October 1958) is a Paraguayan former footballer, who played as a goalkeeper. He played his club football for Independiente F.B.C., Guaraní and Olimpia Asunción.

Coronel was a member of the Paraguayan squad that competed in the 1979 FIFA World Youth Championship and was also part of the Paraguay national football team that participated in the 1986 FIFA World Cup, where he was the third goalkeeper of the squad.

References

1958 births
Living people
Paraguayan footballers
Paraguay under-20 international footballers
Paraguayan expatriate footballers
Paraguay international footballers
Club Guaraní players
Club Olimpia footballers
Club Deportivo Universidad Católica footballers
Chilean Primera División players
Expatriate footballers in Chile
1986 FIFA World Cup players
Association football goalkeepers